The Summer Hits Tour 2018 was the first stadium tour by British girl group Little Mix. It began on July 6, 2018 in East Sussex, England, and concluded on July 29, 2018 in Inverness, Scotland. The group performed at fifteen shows across England, Wales, and Scotland and grossed over $10.4 million worldwide, and sold  over 150,000 tickets through seven confirmed shows. The tours official box office and attendance numbers are unknown because information from eight other previous shows are unaccounted for. British boy group Rak-Su and Australian music trio Germein was announced as support acts.

Background
The tour was announced on 27 November 2017, with 15 stadium shows. The tickets went on sale 30 November.

On 21 May 2018, Capital FM reported that the Swansea, Hull, Bolton and Huddersfield shows were sold out. Clare Youell from Essex Live reported on 4 July 2018 that the Colchester show was sold out. Tim Redigolo from Northampton Chronicle & Echo add that the concert in Northampton sold out in six hours.

Critical reception
David Bennun of Metro gave the concert at Hove, County Cricket Ground, four out of five stars, writing: "They breezed through their catalogue of singles in the most joyous and refreshing way. Sometimes, you don’t need to innovate. You just need to be fun and good" and add "this was all about songs, voices and personality; Little Mix are well equipped with all three". Lauren Hockney of the East Anglian Daily Times gave a positive review to Little Mix's show in Colchester, stating that "their harmonies were slick and the range in their voices, Perrie’s in particular, was impressive". Susie Beever of Examiner Live praised the Huddersfield show saying that "Little Mix’s good-humoured and fun-filled festival was the perfect way to start the summer. But what was perhaps most captivating, and sets the band apart from so many generic and manufactured pop artists, was the message they brought", adding: "Granted, John Smith’s Stadium is no Wembley. But with big voices and even bigger personalities, Little Mix turned what was a small-budget concert into the biggest party Huddersfield has seen in a very long time."

Jessica Long of Norwich Evening News stated that "with strength, sass and unity, Little Mix really did bring girl power to Norwich." Katie Davis of Kent Online review the Maidstone show, declaring that the group "put on a thrilling show that even got dragged-along-dads dancing" also add that "with an estimated 30,000 people there, squeals and shouts were definitely not in short supply - but this just added to the atmosphere and was a clear indicator of just how popular the band has become". Simon Duke of Chronicle Live gave five stars to the Gateshead show stating: "I say this every time I see Little Mix, but just as their albums sell more copies every time, their concerts get all the more impressive". David Pollock of The Scotsman wrote, about the Falkirk show, that Little Mix "were bright and entertaining, their show a well targeted blend of pop hooks, only very lightly broached adult themes and the confident assurance of positive role models. Their costumes and set bore a bright retro-futurist aesthetic, with one foot in the 1980s and one firmly in the present."

Setlist  
This set list is from the show on 6 July 2018 in Hove. It is not intended to represent all concerts for the tour.

"Touch"
"Reggaetón Lento (Remix)" 
"How Ya Doin'?"
"Love Me Like You" 
"Hair"
"Little Me"
"No More Sad Songs"
"Wings"
"Change Your Life"
"Move"
"Black Magic"
"Salute"
"Only You"
"Shout Out To My Ex"
Encore
"Secret Love Song, Pt II"
"Power"

Tour dates

References

2018 concert tours
Little Mix concert tours